Local field potentials (LFP) are transient electrical signals generated in nervous and other tissues by the summed and synchronous electrical activity of the individual cells (e.g. neurons) in that tissue. LFP are "extracellular" signals, meaning that they are generated by transient imbalances in ion concentrations in the spaces outside the cells, that result from cellular electrical activity.   LFP are 'local' because they are recorded by an electrode placed nearby the generating cells.  As a result of the Inverse-square law, such electrodes can only 'see' potentials in spatially limited radius. They are 'potentials' because they are generated by the voltage that results from charge separation in the extracellular space. They are 'field' because those extracellular charge separations essentially create a local electric field. LFP are typically recorded with a high-impedance microelectrode placed in the midst of the population of cells generating it.  They can be recorded, for example, via a microelectrode placed in the brain of a human or animal subject, or in an in vitro brain thin slice.

Background

During local field potential recordings, a signal is recorded using an extracellular microelectrode placed sufficiently far from individual local neurons to prevent any particular cell from dominating the electrophysiological signal. This signal is then low-pass filtered, cut off at ~300 Hz, to obtain the local field potential (LFP) that can be recorded electronically or displayed on an oscilloscope for analysis. The low impedance and positioning of the electrode allows the activity of a large number of neurons to contribute to the signal. The unfiltered signal reflects the sum of action potentials from cells within approximately 50-350 μm from the tip of the electrode  and slower ionic events from within 0.5–3 mm from the tip of the electrode. The low-pass filter removes the spike component of the signal and passes the lower frequency signal, the LFP.

The voltmeter or analog-to-digital converter to which the microelectrode is connected measures the electrical potential difference (measured in volts) between the microelectrode and a reference electrode.  One end of the reference electrode is also connected to the voltmeter while the other end is placed in a medium which is continuous with, and compositionally identical to the extracellular medium. In a simple fluid, with no biological component present, there would be slight fluctuations in the measured potential difference around an equilibrium point, this is known as the thermal noise. This is due to the random movement of ions in the medium and electrons in the electrode. However, when placed in neural tissue the opening of an ion channel results in the net flow of ions into the cell from the extracellular medium, or out of the cell into the extracellular medium. These local currents result in larger changes in the electrical potential between the local extracellular medium and the interior of the recording electrode. The overall recorded signal thus represents the potential caused by the sum of all local currents on the surface of the electrode.

Synchronised input

The local field potential is believed to represent the sum of synaptic inputs into the observed area, as opposed to the spike data, which represents the output from the area. In the LFP, high-frequency fluctuations in the potential difference are filtered out, leaving only the slower fluctuations. The fast fluctuations are mostly caused by the short inward and outward currents of action potentials, while the direct contribution of action potentials is minimal in the LFP. The LFP is thus composed of the more sustained currents in the tissue, such as the synaptic and somato-dendritic currents. Data-driven models have shown a predictive relationship between the LFPs and spike activity. The major slow currents involved in generating the LFP are believed to be the same that generate the postsynaptic potential (PSP). It was originally thought that EPSPs and IPSPs were the exclusive constituents of LFPs, but phenomena unrelated to synaptic events were later found to contribute to the signal (Kobayashi 1997).

Geometrical arrangement 

Which cells contribute to the slow field variations is determined by the geometric configuration of the cells themselves. In some cells, the dendrites face one direction and the soma another, such as the pyramidal cells. This is known as an open field geometrical arrangement. When there is simultaneous activation of the dendrites a strong dipole is produced. In cells where the dendrites are arranged more radially, the potential difference between individual dendrites and the soma tend to cancel out with diametrically opposite dendrites, this configuration is called a closed field geometrical arrangement. As a result the net potential difference over the whole cell when the dendrites are simultaneously activated tends to be very small. Thus changes in the local field potential represent simultaneous dendritic events in cells in the open field configuration.

Low-pass filtering of extracellular space 

Part of the low-pass filtering giving rise to local field potentials is due to complex electrical properties of extracellular space. The fact that the extracellular space is not homogeneous, and composed of a complex aggregate of highly conductive fluids and low-conductive and capacitive membranes, can exert strong low-pass filtering properties. Ionic diffusion, which plays an important role in membrane potential variations, can also act as a low-pass filter.

References

External links
 Mechanisms of local field potentials (Scholarpedia)

Electrophysiology
Action potentials